Henry Strong McCall (February 14, 1819 – March 19, 1893) was an American lawyer and author.

McCall, fifth son of Henry and Melissa (Hale) McCall, was born in Lebanon, Connecticut, on February 14, 1819.  He graduated from Yale College in 1842.  Immediately upon graduation he went to Albany, N. Y., where he taught in the Collegiate Institute until February, 1847. In May, 1847, he was admitted to the bar, and then began practice in Albany, where he continued to reside until his death. He published several legal works which attained a wide circulation and passed through numerous editions such as, Notes to the New York Code of Civil Procedure, The Clerk's Assistant, and The Constable's Guide.  After a professional life of great usefulness he was stricken down in the summer of 1885 by paralysis, which so affected his vocal organs that he was thenceforth unable to speak.  His mind remained clear, he enjoyed reading and the company of his friends, and his general health was good, up to the time when a second stroke of paralysis terminated fatally, at his home in Albany, on March 19, 1893, in his 75th year.

He married, on May 10, 1849, Rhoda W., daughter of Ebenezer Peaslee, of Bridgeport, Madison County, N. Y., by whom he had three children: two daughters (one of whom died in infancy) and one son.

External links
 Books by McCall
 

1819 births
1893 deaths
People from Lebanon, Connecticut
Yale College alumni
New York (state) lawyers
American legal writers
American male non-fiction writers
19th-century American lawyers